KOXE is a radio station airing a country music format licensed to Brownwood, Texas, broadcasting on 101.3 MHz FM.  The station is owned by Brown County Broadcasting Co.

References

External links

Country radio stations in the United States
OXE